Domènec Ruiz Devesa (born 1978) is a Spanish politician of the Spanish Socialist Workers' Party (PSOE) who was elected as a Member of the European Parliament in 2019.

Political career
Ruiz Devesa has since been serving on the Committee on Culture and Education and the Committee on Constitutional Affairs. Since 2021, he has been part of the Parliament's delegation to the Conference on the Future of Europe. In 2022, he was the parliament's rapporteur on a proposal for an overhaul of European election rules that would give all EU citizens aged 18 and older a greater role in choosing the Commission president, allow them to vote for pan-European MEPs and choose postal voting. 

In addition to his committee assignments, Ruiz Devesa is a member of the European Parliament Intergroup on Climate Change, Biodiversity and Sustainable Development, the European Parliament Intergroup on LGBT Rights, the European Parliament Intergroup on Trade Unions and the Spinelli Group.

References

Living people
MEPs for Spain 2019–2024
Spanish Socialist Workers' Party MEPs
1978 births